Fiastra is a comune (municipality) in the Province of Macerata in the Italian region Marche, located about  southwest of Ancona and about  southwest of Macerata.

Fiastra borders the following municipalities: Camerino, Cessapalombo, Fiordimonte, Pievebovigliana, San Ginesio, Sarnano. On 1 January 2017, it incorporated the former commune of Acquacanina.

Among the churches is that of San Paolo.

See also
Monti Sibillini

References

Cities and towns in the Marche